James Tennant McVea (born 20 January 1988, in Ballybeen) is a Northern Irish footballer, who currently plays for Lionsbridge FC of USL League Two and is the associate head coach for the Old Dominion Monarchs.

Career

Early career in Northern Ireland
McVea played youth football for Dungoyne Boys before moving to Ards in 2004 where he made 23 appearances for the senior team. While at Ards he made multiple international appearances for Northern Ireland at U17, U18 and U19 levels. McVea attended Regent House Grammar School before moving to the United States to attend and play college soccer at Loyola University Maryland.

College
McVea played four years at Loyola; in his freshman season he was named to the MAAC All-Rookie, and MAAC Second Team squad. His sophomore year he was named the MAAC Defensive Player of the Year, and earned spots on the league First Team, and the NSCAA/adidas All-North Atlantic Regional first team. In his Junior year he was again named MAAC Defensive Player of the Year, MAAC First Team and the NSCAA/ adidas All North Atlantic Region first team but was also awarded NSCAA/ adidas 1st Team All American honors and was named to the MAC Hermann Trophy watch list. As a senior McVea was again on the MAC Hermann Trophy watch list and was named MAAC Defensive Player of the Year for a third straight year making him the first player to receive the accolade in 3 consecutive seasons. He was also a MAAC First Team selection, NSCAA/ adidas All North Atlantic Region first team selection, and was nominated for the prestigious Lowe's Senior CLASS Award 
. He finished his college career having played 83 games for the Greyhounds, with 6 goals and 2 assists to his name. He was named to the Metro Atlantic Athletic Conference 40th Anniversary Men’s Soccer Team on September 1, 2020.

Professional
McVea turned professional in 2010 when he signed to play for FC Lahti in the Veikkausliiga. He made his professional debut on April 17, 2010 in the team's 2010 season opener against FF Jaro.

Personal
McVea graduated from Loyola University Maryland with a degree in Advertising and Public Relations. He also minored in Business Administration.

References

External links
Loyola bio 
Fc Lahti bio
Ards FC Club Honours

1988 births
Living people
Association footballers from Northern Ireland
FC Lahti players
Fredericksburg Gunners players
Virginia Beach City FC players
Veikkausliiga players
Expatriate footballers in Finland
Expatriate association footballers from Northern Ireland
USL League Two players
Loyola Greyhounds men's soccer players
Expatriate soccer players in the United States
All-American men's college soccer players
Association football defenders
Expatriate sportspeople from Northern Ireland in the United States
Football managers from Northern Ireland
Old Dominion Monarchs men's soccer coaches
Elon Phoenix men's soccer coaches
Lionsbridge FC players
National Premier Soccer League players
Major Indoor Soccer League (2008–2014) players
NIFL Championship players
Ards F.C. players